"Maybach" is a song by American rapper 42 Dugg, and the fifth single from his fourth mixtape Free Dem Boyz (2021). It features American rapper Future and was produced by G1, Chosen 1, Yung Dee, DaBoyDame, and G Koop. The song sees the rappers "harmonizing about street scars and current wealth".

Controversy
The song was previewed on May 19, 2021, and circulated around the internet because of Future's lyrics about his ex-girlfriend Lori Harvey: "Tell Steve Harvey I don't want her / One thing I never seen was a bitch to leave." On May 27, 2021, 42 Dugg leaked an original verse of the song, in which Future also disses Steve Harvey and Michael B. Jordan: "Magic City, I'm the owner / Tell Steve Harvey I don't want her / Must have forgotten to tell her daddy she begged me not to leave / Put baguettes on your ankles damn near up to your knees / She didn't have a choice but to go fuck a lame after me / Realest nigga hit the twat, she damn near OD'ed".

Music video
The music video, released on May 20, 2021, was directed by Jerry Productions. In it, 42 Dugg and Future are seen in Maybachs holding up large sums of cash. They also show off "gaudy jewelry, high-priced champagne, and beautiful women".

Charts

Weekly charts

Year-end charts

Certifications

References

2021 singles
2021 songs
42 Dugg songs
Future (rapper) songs
Songs written by 42 Dugg
Songs written by Future (rapper)
Collective Music Group singles
Interscope Records singles